Zhang Yuzhe is a lunar impact crater located on the Lunar far side near the southern pole. The crater is located between the prominent craters Crommelin and Zeeman. Zhang Yuzhe was adopted and named after Chinese astronomer Zhang Yuzhe by the IAU in August, 2010.

See also 
 2051 Chang, asteroid

References

External links 
 LAC-142 area — Map

Impact craters on the Moon